Jacob Pieter van Braam (Werkhoven, 27 October 1737 – Zwolle, 16 July 1803) was a Dutch admiral.

Van Braam joined the Admiralty of Amsterdam in 1748 as a midshipman. In 1751 he was captured by Barbary corsairs and would be a slave until 1753. On 25 February 1753 he was promoted to lieutenant and in 1758 to lieutenant-commander.

In 1764 he made the transition to the Dutch East India Company (VOC) where he was promoted to captain on 14 July 1766. From 1767 until 1773 he was provisions master in Bengal. In 1776 he temporarily left the VOC to become a Dutch post-captain; in 1782 he was in the rank of captain, commander of a regiment of marines under lieutenant admiral Willem van Wassenaar Spanbroek. In 1783 he was appointed commander of the VOC, commodore and member of the raad van Indië (Council of India; the governing council of the VOC colonial empire). From 1784 until 1786 he served as vlootvoogd (fleetguardian; admiral in charge of a fleet) in the Indian waters with four ships of the line and two frigates. In this function he was responsible for ending a siege of Malacca City by Riau troops and conquering Selangor.

In 1786 he returned to the Netherlands and once again joined the admiralty. On 12 June 1788 he was appointed schout-bij-nacht. On 10 May 1793 Van Braam was appointed vice admiral with the Admiralty of Amsterdam, and he retired on 27 February 1795.

External links 
  Jacob Pieter van Braam at Nederlands Scheepvaartmuseum
   at Nationaal Archief

1737 births
1803 deaths
Admirals of the navy of the Dutch Republic
18th-century Dutch people
People from Bunnik
Sailors on ships of the Dutch East India Company
Dutch military personnel of the French Revolutionary Wars
18th-century Dutch military personnel